2-Amino-1,2-dihydronapthalene (2-ADN), also known as 2-aminodilin (2-AD), is a stimulant drug. It is a rigid analogue of phenylisobutylamine and substitutes for amphetamine in rat discrimination tests, although at approximately one fourth the potency. It is closely related to 2-aminotetralin (2-amino-1,2,3,4-tetrahydronaphthalene), which also substitutes for amphetamine, and is about two times as potent in comparison.

See also 
 2-Aminoindane
 2-Aminotetralin
 2-Naphthylamine

References 

Stimulants
Norepinephrine-dopamine releasing agents